Jewish Cemetery in Wiślica is the cemetery of the Jewish community which lived in Wiślica, Poland, until 1942. The cemetery was created in the 17th century. It is located in the northwest part of the village, near the Złota street, on a woody terrain.

The cemetery was destroyed during and after the Second World War. In the 1980s, a narrow asphalt road, linking the Złota street to the village's bypass, was built in the middle of the necropolis. Nowadays, the cemetery contains only a few remains of destroyed graves and one grave with preserved tombstone (mazewa). A few years ago, the cemetery has been desecrated: anti-Semitic and Nazi symbols have been painted on the remaining gravestones. The cemetery was restored in 2016.

References

External links
 Video recorded in the Jewish cemetery in Wiślica (2008)

Wislica
Busko County
Buildings and structures in Świętokrzyskie Voivodeship
Holocaust locations in Poland
Cemetery vandalism and desecration